Der Kurier was a newspaper in West Berlin during 1945–1966.  Initially it was funded by the French occupying forces in Berlin. It was the first evening paper in Berlin and initially it was published in the tabloid style ("boulevard style").  It also published a weekly issue for the German prisoners of war in France.

References

German-language newspapers
Daily newspapers published in Germany
West Berlin
1945 establishments in Germany
Newspapers established in 1945
Publications disestablished in 1966
Defunct newspapers published in Germany